Atheist feminism is a branch of feminism that also advocates atheism. Atheist feminists hold that religion is a prominent source of female oppression and inequality, believing that the majority of the religions are sexist and oppressive towards women.

In addition, atheist feminism opposes sexism within the atheist population. For example, Victoria Bekiempis wrote in The Guardian: 

The atheist Sikivu Hutchinson wrote about the hiring of David Silverman by Atheist Alliance International:

Silverman resigned his position as Executive Director of Atheist Alliance International in December 2019.

At the June 2011 World Atheist Convention, on a panel that also included the new atheist Richard Dawkins, the atheist Rebecca Watson spoke about sexism within the atheist movement. Among the various topics in a vlog posted following her return from her trip, Watson wrote about how after the talk around 4 am after leaving the hotel bar, a man from the group followed her into the hotel elevator and said to her "Don't take this the wrong way, but I find you very interesting, and I would like to talk more. Would you like to come to my hotel room for coffee?"  Watson cited contextual reasons why she believed this was inappropriate, and advised, "guys, don't do that." The ensuing discussion and criticism across several websites, including Reddit and the Pharyngula blog, became highly polarized and heated to the point of name-calling along with some personal threats, including rape and death threats. The controversy further increased when Richard Dawkins joined the blog discussion later in 2011, describing her response as an overreaction since a man had merely conversed with her, "politely".  Dawkins contrasted the "elevator incident" with the plight of women in Islamic countries. 
The result of this exchange led to an extended internet flame war that several reports dubbed "Elevatorgate". Although Elevatorgate controversy was covered or mentioned by several major media outlets with a wide audience, most of the considerable controversy occurred in the atheist blogosphere.

History

Ernestine Rose 

The first known feminist who was also an atheist was Ernestine Rose, born in Poland on January 13, 1810. Her open confession of disbelief in Judaism when she was a teenager brought her into conflict with her father, who was a rabbi, and an unpleasant relationship developed. In order to force her into the obligations of the Jewish faith, her father, without her consent, betrothed her to a friend and fellow Jew when she was sixteen. Instead of arguing her case in a Jewish court (since her father was the local rabbi who ruled on such matters), she went to a secular court in a distant city, pleaded her own case, and won. In 1829 she went to England, and in 1835 she was one of the founders of the British atheist organization Association of All Classes of All Nations, which "called for human rights for all people, regardless of sex, class, color, or national origin". She lectured in England and America (moving to America in May 1836) and was described by Samuel Porter Putnam as "one of the best lecturers of her time". He wrote that "no orthodox [meaning religious] man could meet her in debate".

In the winter of 1836, Judge Thomas Hertell, a radical and freethinker, submitted a married women's property act in the legislature of the state of New York to investigate ways of improving the civil and property rights of married women, and to permit them to hold real estate in their own name, which they were not then permitted to do in New York. Upon hearing of the resolution, Ernestine Rose drew up a petition and began the soliciting of names to support the resolution in the state legislature, sending the petition to the legislature in 1838. This was the first petition drive done by a woman in New York. Rose continued to increase both the number of the petitions and the names until such rights were finally won in 1848, with the passing of the Married Women's Property Act. Others who participated in the work for the bill included Susan B. Anthony, Elizabeth Cady Stanton, Lucretia Mott, and Frances Wright, who were all anti-religious. Later, when Susan B. Anthony and Elizabeth Cady Stanton analyzed the influences which led to the Seneca Falls Convention in 1848, they identified three causes, the first two being the radical ideas of Frances Wright and Ernestine Rose on religion and democracy, and the initial reforms in women's property law in the 1830s and 1840s.

Rose later joined a group of freethinkers who had organized a Society for Moral Philanthropists, at which she often lectured. In 1837, she took part in a debate that continued for thirteen weeks, where her topics included the advocacy of abolition of slavery, women's rights, equal opportunities for education, and civil rights. In 1845 she was in attendance at the First National Convention of Infidels (meaning atheists). Ernestine Rose also introduced "the agitation on the subject of women's suffrage" in Michigan in 1846. In a lecture in Worcester, Massachusetts, in 1851, she opposed calling upon the Bible to underwrite the rights of women, claiming that human rights and freedom of women were predicated upon "the laws of humanity" and that women, therefore, did not require the written authority of either Paul or Moses, because "those laws and our claim are prior" to both.

She attended the Women's Rights Convention in the Tabernacle, New York City, on September 10, 1853, and spoke at the Hartford Bible Convention in 1854. It was in March of that year, also, that she took off with Susan B. Anthony on a speaking tour to Washington, D.C. Susan B. Anthony arranged the meetings and Ernestine Rose did all of the speaking; after this successful tour, Susan B. Anthony embarked on her own first lecture tour.

In October 1854 Ernestine Rose was elected president of the National Women's Rights Convention at Philadelphia, overcoming the objection that she was unsuitable because of her atheism. Susan B. Anthony supported her in this fight, declaring that every religion—and none—should have an equal right on the platform. In 1856 she spoke at the Seventh National Woman's [Rights] Convention saying in part,

She appeared again in Albany, New York, for the State Women's Rights Convention in early February 1861, the last one to be held until after the Civil War. On May 14, 1863, she shared the podium with Elizabeth Cady Stanton, Susan B. Anthony, Lucy Stone, and Antoinette Blackwell when the first Women's National Loyal League met to call for equal rights for women, and to support the government in the Civil War "in so far as it makes a war for freedom".

She was in attendance at the American Equal Rights Association meeting in which there was a schism, and on May 15, 1869, joined with Elizabeth Cady Stanton, Susan B. Anthony, and Lucy Stone to form a new organization, the National Woman Suffrage Association, which fought for both male and female suffrage, taking a position on the executive committee. She died at Brighton, England, on August 4, 1892, at age eighty-two.

Elizabeth Cady Stanton and Matilda Joslyn Gage 

The most prominent other people to publicly advocate for feminism and to challenge Christianity in the 1800s were Elizabeth Cady Stanton and Matilda Joslyn Gage. In 1885 Stanton wrote an essay entitled "Has Christianity Benefited Woman?" arguing that it had in fact hurt women's rights, and stating, "All religions thus far have taught the headship and superiority of man, [and] the inferiority and subordination of woman. Whatever new dignity, honor, and self-respect the changing theologies may have brought to man, they have all alike brought to woman but another form of humiliation." In 1893 Matilda Joslyn Gage wrote the book for which she is best known, Woman, Church, and State, which was one of the first books to draw the conclusion that Christianity is a primary impediment to the progress of women, as well as civilization. In 1895 Elizabeth Cady Stanton wrote The Woman's Bible, revised and continued with another book of the same name in 1898, in which she criticized religion and stated "the Bible in its teachings degrades women from Genesis to Revelation." She died in 1902.

Today 

Atheist feminist Anne Nicol Gaylor cofounded the Freedom From Religion Foundation in 1976 with her daughter, Annie Laurie Gaylor, and was also editor of Freethought Today from 1984 to 2009, when she became executive editor. Aside from promoting atheism in general, her atheist feminist activities include writing the book Woe To The Women: The Bible Tells Me So, first published in 1981, which is now in its 4th printing. This book exposes and discusses sexism in the Bible. Furthermore, her 1997 book, Women Without Superstition: "No Gods, No Masters", was the first collection of the writings of historic and contemporary female freethinkers. She has also written several articles on religion's harm to women.

Other notable atheist feminists active today include Ayaan Hirsi Ali, Ophelia Benson, Amanda Marcotte, and Taslima Nasrin. and Sikivu Hutchinson author of Moral Combat, Black Atheists, Gender Politics and the Values Wars, the first book by an African-American woman on atheism, racial politics, gender justice and feminism.  African-American feminist atheists like Hutchinson espouse an intersectional approach to feminist organizing, activism and scholarship that is rooted in the lived experiences and social history of communities of color with respect to racism, white supremacy, sexism/misogynoir, heterosexism and capitalist oppression.  Black feminist atheist praxis differs from atheist feminist approaches that confine critique of religion to dogma and gender oppression rather than looking at how religious hierarchies are also informed by imperialism, capitalism and segregation. Feminist activist from FEMEN Inna Shevchenko speaks out against organised religions as one of the major historical obstacles for women's liberation and feminism. At the Secular Conference 2017 in London, speaking on compatibility of feminism and religion, she said

In 2012, the first "Women in Secularism" conference was held, from May 18 to 20 at the Crystal City Marriott at Reagan National Airport in Arlington, Virginia.

In August 2012, Jey McCreight founded a movement known as Atheism Plus that "applies skepticism to everything, including social issues like sexism, racism, politics, poverty, and crime." Atheism Plus had a website that was active from 2012 to 2016.

In July 2014, a joint statement by atheist activists Ophelia Benson and Richard Dawkins was issued stating,

Dawkins added,

See also 
 
 Christianity and domestic violence
 Islam and domestic violence
 Gender and religion
 History of atheism
 Matriarchal religion
 Women and religion

References 

Atheism in the United States
Feminism in the United States
Feminist movements and ideologies